Salikata National Park is a protected area of the Philippines located in the municipality of Lumba-Bayabao, Lanao del Sur in Mindanao Island. Nestled in the thickly forested foothills of the Mount Ragang range (also known as the Piapayungan mountain range), the park is one of the six national parks in the province of Lanao del Sur declared in 1965. The area is characterized by waterfalls, river gorge, rocky cliffs and dense canopy stretching the length of the Gata River valley from barangay Salaman to Mapantao near the provincial border with Cotabato.

References

See also
List of national parks of the Philippines

National parks of the Philippines
Protected areas established in 1965
1965 establishments in the Philippines
Geography of Lanao del Sur
Tourist attractions in Lanao del Sur